Bethanidine (or betanidine) is a sympatholytic drug.

See also 
 Phenoxybenzamine

References 

Adrenergic release inhibitors
Guanidines